Venezuela competed at the 1988 Summer Olympics in Seoul, South Korea. Seventeen competitors, fifteen men and two women, took part in fifteen events in seven sports.

Competitors
The following is the list of number of competitors in the Games.

Boxing

Men's Light Flyweight (– 48 kg)
 Marcelino Bolivar
 First Round – Bye
 Second Round – Lost to Jesus Beltre (DOM), on points (1:4)

Men's Flyweight (– 51 kg) 
 David Griman
 First Round — Lost to Serafim Todorov (BUL), 1:4

Men's Bantamweight (– 54 kg) 
 Abraham Torres
 First Round – Bye
 Second Round – Defeated Teekaram Rajcoomar (MTS), on points (5:0)
 Third Round — Lost to Phajol Moolsan (THA), 1:4

Men's Featherweight (– 57 kg) 
 Omar Catari
 First Round – Bye
 Second Round – Defeated Moussa Kagambega (BFA), on knock-out (1st round)
 Third Round — Lost to Abdelhak Achik (MAR), on knock-out (1st round)

Men's Lightweight (– 60 kg) 
 José Pérez
 First Round – Bye
 Second Round – Lost to Nergüin Enkhbat (MGL), on points (0:5)

Men's Welterweight (– 67 kg) 
 José García
 First Round – Bye
 Second Round – Lost to Jan Dydak (POL), on points (1:4)

Cycling

Four cyclists, all male, represented Venezuela in 1988.

Men's road race
 Leonardo Sierra
 Enrique Campos
 Ali Parra

Men's points race
 Alexis Méndez

Equestrian

Jumping

Judo

Table tennis

Synchronized swimming

One synchronized swimmer represented Venezuela in 1988.

Women's solo
 María Elena Giusti
 Final — 13th place

Weightlifting

Men

References

External links
Official Olympic Reports

Nations at the 1988 Summer Olympics
1988
1988 in Venezuelan sport